Chinese Taipei participated at the 2018 Asian Para Games which was held in Jakarta, Indonesia from 6 to 13 October 2018. 89 athletes competed for Chinese Taipei in eleven sports namely: athletics, swimming, powerlifting, shooting, archery, table tennis, judo, wheelchair tennis, badminton, wheelchair basketball and bowling.

Medalists

Medals by sport

Medals by day

See also
 Chinese Taipei at the 2018 Asian Games

References

2018
Nations at the 2018 Asian Para Games
Asian Para Games